Ermer Robinson was a native of San Diego.  He graduated from high school in 1942.  Robinson was a member of the Harlem Globetrotters. Robinson shot the game winning basket when the Globetrotters beat the Lakers.

Robinson was Head Coach of the Oakland Oaks and the general manager for the Chicago Majors, both of the American Basketball League.  He was a coach for Oakland in 1962.  He joined the US Army and the Globetrotters when the war ended. He died from cancer in 1983.

References

Harlem Globetrotters players